Yohann Lasimant (born 4 September 1989) is a French professional footballer who plays as a winger and midfielder for Championnat National 3 club Besançon Football.

Club career

Rennes and Sedan
Born in Besançon, Lasimant began his career at local club SC Clémenceau. In 2002, he moved to the biggest club in the city, Besançon RC. He gained the attention of Rennes scouts during his time here and joined the Bretagne club's training center in 2006. He joined the club's under-18 side in 2007 and helped the club win the under-18 league championship. During the same season, he was selected to France's under-18 side. The following season, he was a part of the youth side that won the Coupe Gambardella.

At the start of the 2008–09 season, Lasimant played mainly in the reserves. He received his first call up to the senior squad by manager Guy Lacombe on 14 February 2009 in a league match against Nancy appearing on the bench in a 1–1 draw. After appearing on the bench several times for the rest of the season, he finally made his debut on the final match day of the season in a 0–4 defeat to Marseille appearing as a substitute in the 72nd minute.

He joined second division club Sedan on loan for the entire 2009–10 season, in order to receive some playing time. In his competitive debut with Sedan, he scored the club's second goal in their 2–0 win over Caen in the Coupe de la Ligue.

Grenoble and Larissa
On 23 July 2010, Lasimant signed a two-year contract with Ligue 2 club Grenoble. In February 2012 he joined Greek second division club Larissa and signed a contract until the end of the season.

Leyton Orient
In July 2013, Lasimant impressed Leyton Orient manager Russell Slade with two goals in their 7–0 friendly victory over Chelmsford City. After going on trial a week later with Peterborough United, Lasimant signed a one-year contract with Orient on 16 July. He scored his first goal for the club in a 3–1 defeat at Coventry City. His second goal was a dramatic last minute winner against Gillingham.  At the end of the season he was released by Orient along with four other players.

Besançon
After one year in Bulgaria, one year with Jura Sud, one year again with Concarneau and six months alone with an injury, he returned to his youth club in his hometown: Racing Besançon in February 2019. In 2020, he signed for the other club in the town, Besançon Football.

International career
Lasimant has earned caps with the France under-19 team. On 25 May 2009, he was selected to the under-20 squad that participated in the 2009 Mediterranean Games. Lasimant appeared in three matches scoring one goal in a 1–0 victory over Malta.

Career statistics

Honours 
Rennes U18

 Coupe Gambardella: 2007–08

References

External links
 
 
 

Living people
1989 births
Sportspeople from Besançon
Association football wingers
Association football midfielders
French footballers
Stade Rennais F.C. players
CS Sedan Ardennes players
Grenoble Foot 38 players
Leyton Orient F.C. players
PFC Lokomotiv Plovdiv players
Jura Sud Foot players
US Concarneau players
Racing Besançon players
Ligue 1 players
Ligue 2 players
First Professional Football League (Bulgaria) players
Championnat National players
Expatriate footballers in England
Expatriate footballers in Bulgaria
France youth international footballers
Competitors at the 2009 Mediterranean Games
Mediterranean Games competitors for France
Besançon Football players
Footballers from Bourgogne-Franche-Comté
Expatriate footballers in Greece
Expatriate footballers in Hungary
French expatriate footballers
Athlitiki Enosi Larissa F.C. players
Egri FC players
French expatriate sportspeople in England
French expatriate sportspeople in Greece
French expatriate sportspeople in Bulgaria
French expatriate sportspeople in Hungary